Mill Creek is a  tributary of the Conestoga River in Lancaster County, Pennsylvania, in the United States.

Mill Creek joins the Conestoga River near the community of Lyndon.

See also
List of rivers of Pennsylvania

References

Rivers of Pennsylvania
Tributaries of the Conestoga River
Rivers of Lancaster County, Pennsylvania